Yèvre-la-Ville is a commune in the Loiret department in north-central France.

History
Since 1973, the village of Yèvre-le-Châtel, previously an independent commune, is part of Yèvre-la-Ville. Yèvre-le-Châtel is a member of the Les Plus Beaux Villages de France ("The most beautiful villages of France") association.

Population

See also
Communes of the Loiret department

References

Communes of Loiret
Plus Beaux Villages de France